In Defense of Internment: The Case for 'Racial Profiling' in World War II and the War on Terror is a 2004 book written by conservative American political commentator Michelle Malkin.  Malkin defends the internment of Japanese Americans in the United States during World War II and racial profiling of Arabs during the post-2001 War on Terror. The book's message has been condemned by Japanese American groups and civil rights advocates. Its point of view has received both support, and criticism by academics.

References
With respect to the 1984 commission decision reviewing Executive Order 9066, Malkin notes that the commission did not review the Magic cables, an omission decried at the time by the Under-secretary who was involved in the decision making process. The book is based on primary source citations including copies of original documents and Magic (cryptography) cables.

Writing of the book
On her website, Malkin wrote:

I was compelled to write this book after watching ethnic activists, historians, and politicians repeatedly play the World War II internment card after the September 11 attacks. The Bush Administration's critics have equated every reasonable measure to interrogate, track, detain, and deport potential terrorists with the "racist" and "unjustified" World War II internment policies of President Roosevelt. To make amends for this "shameful blot" on our history, both Japanese-American and Arab/Muslim-American activists argue against any and all uses of race, ethnicity, nationality, and religion in shaping current homeland security policies. Misguided guilt about the past continues to hamper our ability to prevent future terrorist attacks.

Response to In Defense of Internment
There was considerable media interest in the book especially on the American West Coast and Hawaii, where the impact of relocation and internment in World War II was greatest. It made the New York Times Best Seller list in September 2004. As anticipated by Malkin, the book proved to be highly controversial.

Support 
Charles A. Lofgren, Professor Emeritus of American History and Politics at Stanford University, reviewing the book in the Claremont Review of Books, said that Malkin provided "a largely fair assessment of the relocation program in operation" and that it is not an assessment that will please those who equate it with the Nazis' death camps. Lofgren wrote:

Political scientist Robert P. Hager, reviewing the book in the Terrorism and Political Violence journal, states that the book is well written and shows extensive research. Defending Malkin, he writes that "those who raise uncomfortable issues in good faith do not deserve to be silenced with blanket allegations of bigotry". Hager praises the book's content assessing that Malkin makes a good case that racial animus was not the reason for the relocation. Hager notes:

Historian Daniel Pipes writes that Malkin "broke the academic single-note scholarship on a critical subject, cutting through a shabby, stultifying consensus" to reveal how, given what was known and not known at the time, President Roosevelt and his staff did the right thing. He stated:

Criticism 
John Tateishi, the Executive Director of the Japanese American Citizens League issued a letter of protest to Malkin on August 24, 2004, calling the book "a desperate attempt to impugn the loyalty of Japanese Americans during World War II to justify harsher governmental policies today in the treatment of Arab and Muslim Americans."

Fred Korematsu, the plaintiff in the Supreme Court case Korematsu v. United States which upheld the constitutionality of internment, wrote:

According to Malkin, it is OK to take away an entire ethnic group's civil rights because some individuals are suspect. [...] It is painful to see reopened for serious debate the question of whether the government was justified in imprisoning Japanese Americans during World War II. It was my hope that my case and the cases of other Japanese American internees would be remembered for the dangers of racial and ethnic scapegoating.

Reviewing the book for the American libertarian magazine Reason, Eric L. Muller of the University of North Carolina Law School wrote:

[T]he evidence Malkin deploys [...] is—at best—mere speculation. This speculation might be worth a moment's reflection if Malkin also addressed the voluminous historical research that has shown the impact of racism, nativism, political pressure, economic jealousies, and war panic on the government's policies toward Japanese Americans. [...] But Malkin does not so much as mention any of that evidence, except to say that a reader can find it elsewhere in 'pedantic tomes' and 'educational propaganda.' She dismisses what she cannot rebut.

Thirty-nine scholars and professional researchers, predominantly Japanese, from the "Historians' Committee for Fairness" signed a letter condemning Malkin's book for alleged "blatant violation of professional standards of objectivity and fairness". Five scholars and professional researchers defended Malkin against the letter.

See also
Propaganda for Japanese-American internment

References

External links
Full text available at Internet Archive
In Defense of Internment Article on the Author's web site

2004 non-fiction books
American political books
Politics of World War II
Politics and race in the United States
Regnery Publishing books
Books about the internment of Japanese Americans
Books critical of modern liberalism in the United States
Books about the United States
Books about terrorism
Books by Michelle Malkin